Carp is a surname. Notable people with the surname include:

Berend Carp (1901–1966), South-African naturalist
Corneliu Carp (1895–1982), Romanian general in World War II
Daniel Carp (born 1948), American businessman
Johan Carp (1897–1962), Dutch sailor
Mike Carp (born 1986), American baseball player
Petre P. Carp (1837–1919), Romanian politician